Koreh or Koroh or Kareh may refer to:
 Kareh, Isfahan
 Kareh, Khuzestan
 Koreh, Markazi
 Koreh, South Khorasan
 Korehi, in Fars Province

See also

Karey (disambiguation)
 Karreh (disambiguation)
 Kureh (disambiguation)